The McConnell Historic District, in Franklin County, Georgia near Carnesville, Georgia, is a rural crossroads community located on GA 51, approximately 2.5 mi. northwest of its junction with I-85.  It is a  historic district which was listed on the National Register of Historic Places in 1996.  The listing included 30 contributing buildings and two contributing structures.

It includes the Plain View School and the McConnell-Richardson-Bellamy House.

References

External links

Historic districts on the National Register of Historic Places in Georgia (U.S. state)
National Register of Historic Places in Franklin County, Georgia
Buildings and structures completed in 1880